Hélène Rémy (born 1932) is a retired French film actress. She spent much of her career working in the Italian film industry.

Selected filmography
 Cage of Girls (1949)
 Sending of Flowers (1950)
 Clara de Montargis (1951)
 Paris Is Always Paris (1951)
 Five Paupers in an Automobile (1952)
 Giovinezza (1952)
 We Two Alone (1952)
 Torment of the Past (1952)
 A Thief in Paradise (1952)
 The Pagans (1953)
 Disowned (1954)
 Husbands in the City (1957)
 The Vampire and the Ballerina (1960)
 Behind Closed Doors (1961)
 The Last of the Vikings (1961)	
 Borsalino (1970)

References

Bibliography
 Curti, Roberto. Italian Gothic Horror Films, 1957-1969. McFarland, 2015.

External links

1932 births
Living people
French film actresses
French emigrants to Italy
Actresses from Paris